Val Poschiavo is a valley in the southern, Italian-speaking part of the Swiss canton of Graubünden (Grisons). The main town is Poschiavo.

Geography
Val Poschiavo can be reached from the Upper Engadin valley in the north via Bernina Pass (Passo del Bernina) and from the Italian comune of Livigno via Livigno Pass. In the south it stretches down to the village of Campocologno at the end of the valley, bordering directly on the Italian town of Tirano. Beneath Bernina Pass, the Val da Camp mountain valley leads up to Val Viola Pass in the northeast.

The valley is drained by the Poschiavino river, flowing through Lago di Poschiavo. Smaller lakes in its basin include Lago Bianco, Lago di Saoseo, and Lago di Val Viola. The surrounding mountains of the Bernina Range and the Livigno Alps include the Piz Palü, Piz Cambrena, Piz Varuna, and Piz Lagalb, .

The metre gauge Bernina railway from Tirano over the Bernina Pass into the Engadine Pontresina and St. Moritz region is the only rail link between Italy and eastern Switzerland. A branch of the narrow-gauge Rhaetian Railway, it is the highest-elevation adhesion railway route in Europe and together with the Albula Railway a UNESCO World Heritage Site since 2008.

The two municipalities of Val Poschiavo, Poschiavo and Brusio, form Bernina District in the canton of Graubünden. Villages and hamlets in the valley, some bearing names in the local Lombard language, include: Miralago, La Rasiga, Campascio, Zalende, Viano, Cavaione, Campocologno, Prada, San Carlo, Privilasco, Sant'Antonio, Annunziata, Pagnoncini, Cantone, Li Curt, Sfazù, Müreda, Motta, Cologna, Cavaglia, Pedecosta and Angeli Custodi.

External links

Val Poschiavo tourist office

 
Valleys of the Alps
Regions of Switzerland
Poschiavo